The 2016 Biathlon Junior World Championships was held in Cheile Grădiştei, Romania from January 27 to February 2, 2016. There was a total of 16 competitions: sprint, pursuit, individual, and relay races for men and women.

Schedule
All times are local (UTC+2).

Medal winners

Youth Women

Junior Women

Youth Men

Junior Men

Medal table

References

External links
Official IBU website 

Biathlon Junior World Championships
2016 in biathlon
2016 in Romanian sport
International sports competitions hosted by Romania
2016 in youth sport